Matthew Baylis (born 1971), also known as Matt Baylis and M. H. Baylis, is a British novelist, screenwriter and journalist.

Early life
Baylis was born in Nottingham. He was educated at Merchant Taylors' Boys' School, Crosby, and Trinity College, Cambridge, and spent most of his early years in Southport, Merseyside.

Career 
A former storyliner on BBC One's flagship soap opera EastEnders, he adapted Catrin Collier's novel Hearts of Gold, set in the 1930s, for the screen, and this was broadcast as a two-parter on BBC One in July 2003.

He subsequently went with former EastEnders executive producer Matthew Robinson to Kenya, where he co-created, co-storylined and trained a team of local writers for a six-part drama pilot. Robinson later invited him to Cambodia, to do the same on Taste of Life, a major Cambodian drama series funded by the BBC World Service Trust and the Department for International Development.

Continuing his involvement in Cambodia, Baylis scripted Palace of Dreams, a BBCWST-funded romantic comedy film, aimed at younger audiences; Vanished – a film-noir thriller made by Robinson's company Khmer Mekong Films, which showed to great acclaim across Cambodia in 2009, and has been shown at the Pyongyang International Film Festival; and he co-created, and wrote scripts for AirWaves, a contemporary drama series funded by the U.S. government, which is currently showing on Cambodia's TV channel CTN.

The author of two comic novels, Stranger than Fulham and The Last Ealing Comedy he has been the television critic for the Daily Express since September 2005 – where he writes as Matt Baylis – and also written on television and other subjects for The Guardian, The Sunday Times, The Daily Telegraph, Independent on Sunday and Daily Mail.

His third novel A Death at the Palace is a crime thriller set in Tottenham - the first in the Rex Tracey series - and it was published by Old Street on 13 March 2013.

The 2013 book Man Belong Mrs Queen gives an account of his time on Tanna Island, Vanuatu, researching the Prince Philip Movement . In December 2013 and January 2014 the book was BBC Radio 4's Book of the Week.

His fourth novel, and the second in the Rex Tracey series of Haringey-set crime thrillers, is The Tottenham Outrage published on 15 July 2014 by Old Street.  As well as a contemporary mystery on the streets of North London, this book presents a fact-based, but fictionalized re-imagining of the real Tottenham Outrage, a bungled robbery attempt by Russian anarchists in January 1909.

References

1971 births
Living people
British male journalists
British male novelists
British male screenwriters
British male television writers
People from Nottingham